The Second Battle of Tuxpan was one of the three small battles of the Mexican–American War to occur in Tuxpan, Mexico. The exact date is unknown but was fought between a landing force of Matthew C. Perry's Mosquito Fleet and Mexican soldiers and or militiamen. The engagement resulted in the death of one American sailor and the wounding of six others, two of which were wounded severely. Mexican casualties are unknown. The American occupation and blockade of Tuxpan continued, on June 30, another small skirmish erupted at the town, known as the Third Battle of Tuxpan.

References
 Nevin, David; editor, The Mexican War (1978)
 Bauer, K. Jack, The Mexican–American War 1846–48

External links
 Roll of Honor - U.S. Casualties of Naval Actions in the War with Mexico

Mosquito Fleet Campaign
United States Marine Corps in the 18th and 19th centuries
Naval battles of the Mexican–American War
June 1847 events